Tarbet ( or ) is a place on the south shore of Loch Nevis in Scotland, about  east of Mallaig. The name 'tarbet' (or 'tarbert') refers to a portage or isthmus, in this case it is between Loch Nevis and Loch Morar.

Tarbet has a permanent population of 6. Tarbet is not connected to any roads, and access is by a path from Bracorina, to the east of Morar. There is also an on-demand passenger ferry service to Mallaig and Inverie, in Knoydart.

Populated places in Lochaber